Bézier can refer to:

Pierre Bézier, French engineer and creator of Bézier curves
Bézier curve
Bézier triangle
Bézier spline (disambiguation)
Bézier surface
 The town of Béziers in France
 AS Béziers Hérault, a French rugby union team
Bézier Games, an American board game publisher